Chen Kang (born 24 November 1965) is a Chinese badminton player. He competed in the men's doubles tournament at the 1992 Summer Olympics.

Achievements

World Championships 
Men's doubles

World Cup 
Men's doubles

Asian Games 
Men's doubles

Asian Championships 
Men's doubles

Asian Cup 
Men's doubles

IBF World Grand Prix 
The World Badminton Grand Prix sanctioned by International Badminton Federation (IBF) since from 1983 to 2006.

Men's doubles

IBF International 
Men's doubles

References

External links
 

1965 births
Living people
Chinese male badminton players
Olympic badminton players of China
Badminton players at the 1992 Summer Olympics
Place of birth missing (living people)
Asian Games silver medalists for China
Asian Games bronze medalists for China
Medalists at the 1986 Asian Games
Medalists at the 1994 Asian Games
Asian Games medalists in badminton
Badminton players at the 1986 Asian Games
Badminton players at the 1994 Asian Games
World No. 1 badminton players
20th-century Chinese people
21st-century Chinese people